Claudio Andrés del Tránsito Maldonado Rivera (born 3 January 1980) is a Chilean professional football manager and former player who is currently an  assistant manager at Campeonato Brasileiro Série A club Vasco da Gama.

He formerly played as a defensive midfielder for clubs as Colo-Colo, São Paulo, Cruzeiro, Santos, Fenerbahçe, Flamengo and Corinthians.

Club career

Early career
As a child, Maldonado was with Escuela de Fútbol Municipal de Curicó (Municipal Football Academy of Curicó), later named Juventud 2000, what was founded by the former professional footballer Luis Hernán Álvarez. Next, he moved to Colo-Colo youth ranks after being seen by Néstor Pékerman.

São Paulo
He spent three seasons with São Paulo making 36 Campeonato Brasileiro Série A appearances with the team.

Cruzeiro
In May 2003, Vanderlei Luxemburgo, then coach of Cruzeiro, bought the services of Maldonado. At the time of the purchase, Maldonado's then girlfriend was Luxemburgo's daughter.  Nevertheless, while with Cruzeiro, Maldonado experienced the most success of his career. In 2003, he played for the first team in the history of Brazilian football to win the triple crown.

Santos
For the 2006 season, Maldonado was reunited with former Cruzeiro's coach Luxemburgo at Santos  However at the end of the Brazilian season was scheduled to have ankle surgery which caused him to miss up to two months. After recuperating Maldonado continued playing for Santos reaching the semi-finals of the 2007 Copa Libertadores. Currently Santos has completed the 2007 Campeonato Brasileiro Série A in second place and are eligible to compete in the upcoming Copa Libertadores 2008. He was being tracked by Fenerbahçe, Milan, Real Madrid and Ajax but no firm offers better than Fenerbahçe have been made. At 28 he was at the peak of his potential and European teams wanted to capitalise on this, but they were probably put off by the 8 red cards that he had received in the previous 3 years at club level.

Fenerbahçe
On the beginning of 2008 Maldonado signed with Fenerbahçe in -year contract, at that time managed by Zico. The transaction was via C.A. Rentistas, which the proxy club paid Santos R$2,225,040. He struggled with injuries and spend a little more than a year in the Turkish club.

Flamengo
On August 27, 2009, Flamengo signed a 1-year contract with Maldonado. His debut for his new club was as a substitute in a 3-0 win against Santo André, but since his second match became a first team player. In his first ten matches Flamengo did not suffer any goals, nine of those playing along with Álvaro which signed with Flamengo at the same time, proving his was back at his high level. He scored his first goal for Flamengo after just few matches on November 8 against Atlético Mineiro. His good moment made Chile national team coach Marcelo Bielsa call him up to national team after a period absent. But his return to national team, on November 17 against Slovakia, wasn't as expected, Maldonado played well as a starter, although in the second half he suffered a serious injury in his left knee ligaments leaving out of the fields for four months. Maldonado signed a new 6-month contract in August 2010 and a 2-year contract in January 2011.

Career statistics

International
Along with Chile U20, he won the L'Alcúdia Tournament in 1998.

Maldonado was selected to represent his country, Chile, at the 2000 Summer Olympics as a part of the Under-23 team that won the bronze medal. Maldonado made his international debut on February 12, 2000, in a match versus Bulgaria. Since then Maldonado has appeared in 41 games with the senior squad and has netted one goal. For 2006 FIFA World Cup qualification, Maldonado was a regular with the first team and has since gained the captaincy of the national team. As of recent Maldonado has been called up to serve on the Chile national team that is managed by Marcelo Bielsa.

International goals

Honours

Club
Colo-Colo
 Primera División: 1998, 2014 Clausura

São Paulo
 Campeonato Paulista: 2000, 2002

Cruzeiro
 Campeonato Brasileiro Série A: 2003
 Campeonato Mineiro: 2004

Santos
 Campeonato Paulista: 2006, 2007

Flamengo
Campeonato Brasileiro Série A: 2009
Campeonato Carioca: 2011

Corinthians
Recopa Sudamericana: 2013

International
Chile U20
 L'Alcúdia International Tournament (1): 1998

Chile
Sydney Olympic Games: Bronze medal

References

External links

 
Player Profile @ Flamengo.com.br 
 

1980 births
Living people
People from Curicó
Chilean footballers
Chile international footballers
Chile youth international footballers
Chile under-20 international footballers
Olympic footballers of Chile
Footballers at the 2000 Summer Olympics
Olympic bronze medalists for Chile
Chilean Primera División players
Colo-Colo footballers
Chilean expatriate footballers
Chilean expatriate sportspeople in Brazil
Expatriate footballers in Brazil
Campeonato Brasileiro Série A players
Cruzeiro Esporte Clube players
São Paulo FC players
Santos FC players
CR Flamengo footballers
Sport Club Corinthians Paulista players
Chilean expatriate sportspeople in Turkey
Expatriate footballers in Turkey
Fenerbahçe S.K. footballers
Süper Lig players
2001 Copa América players
Olympic medalists in football
Medalists at the 2000 Summer Olympics
Association football midfielders
Chilean football managers
Chilean expatriate football managers
Expatriate football managers in Brazil